Noel Dwyer (30 October 1934 – 27 December 1992) was an Irish professional footballer.

Born in Dublin, he was a goalkeeper who played his schoolboy football with Stella Maris before moving to Northern Ireland club Ormeau. He went on to play 14 times for the Republic of Ireland national football team between 1959 and 1964.
               
He began his English club career with Wolverhampton Wanderers, where he made just five appearances in the 1957–58 season.
 
He then had spells at West Ham United, Swansea Town, Plymouth Argyle, and Charlton Athletic. He made a total of 213 Football League appearances in his 12-year senior career, 140 of them with Swansea.

Dwyer died in December 1992 at the age of 58. His daughter was married to the footballer Frank Worthington who died in 2021.

References

Sources
 The Complete Who's Who of Irish International Football, 1945-96 (1996):Stephen McGarrigle

Association footballers from County Dublin
Republic of Ireland association footballers
Republic of Ireland international footballers
Republic of Ireland B international footballers
Wolverhampton Wanderers F.C. players
West Ham United F.C. players
Swansea City A.F.C. players
Plymouth Argyle F.C. players
Charlton Athletic F.C. players
1934 births
1992 deaths
English Football League players
Association football goalkeepers
Stella Maris F.C. players
Irish expatriate sportspeople in England
Irish expatriate sportspeople in Wales